Qaleh Chubi (also Romanized as Qal‘eh Chūbī) is a village in Siyakh Darengun Rural District, in the Central District of Shiraz County, Fars Province, Iran. At the 2006 census, its population was 837, in 199 families.

References 

Populated places in Shiraz County